East Garden City is a hamlet and former census-designated place (CDP) in the northeast part of the Town of Hempstead, in the central part of Nassau County, on Long Island, in New York, United States, along the Hempstead/North Hempstead town line. The population was 6,208 at the 2010 census, when it was listed as a CDP. Since then, it is now included in the Uniondale CDP. 

The CDP was mostly a commercial and industrial area and included Nassau Community College, along with a portion of Hofstra University's north campus.

Geography

Beginning on its northern border and proceeding clockwise, East Garden City was bordered on the North by Carle Place and the Village of Westbury in the Town of North Hempstead (the Hempstead/North Hempstead town line); on the East by East Meadow; on the South by Uniondale and the Village of Hempstead; and, on the West by the Village of Hempstead and the Village of Garden City.

East Garden City was one of many areas on Long Island where none of the places in the community have the hamlet name as part of their mailing address: places in East Garden City have either a "Garden City, NY 11530", a "Westbury, NY 11590", a "Uniondale, NY 11553" or a "Hempstead, NY 11550" mailing address.

Demographics
As of the census of 2010, there were 6,208 people living in the then-CDP. There were 1,341 housing units. The racial makeup of the CDP was 67.3% Non-Hispanic White, 16.7% African American, 0.1% Native American, 4.4% Asian, 0.0% Pacific Islander, 9.0% Hispanic, and 3.0% from two or more races.

Controversy & absorption 
In 2015, there were disputes between Uniondale and East Garden City about the latter's existence. 

According to the Long Island Press, "They [civic leaders from Uniondale] argue that planners and developers concocted the name to distance prime real estate north of Hempstead Turnpike from the racially diverse neighborhood on the south side. Lawmakers back Uniondale’s cause, but wiping East Garden City off the map is easier said than done. At stake is what to call the heart of the area also known as the Nassau Hub—home to almost half the county’s economic activity and Nassau Veterans Memorial Coliseum." 

Newsday later notes, "In May [2015], the controversy led to a meeting involving then-Town Supervisor Kate Murray, Rep. Kathleen Rice (D-Garden City) and federal census officials, who, while agreeing to drop the name, indicated it might take 18 months to become official."

References

External links

Hempstead, New York
Hamlets in New York (state)
Hamlets in Nassau County, New York
Census-designated places in New York (state)
Census-designated places in Nassau County, New York